NGC 4872 is a barred lenticular galaxy located about 310 million light-years away in the constellation of Coma Berenices. NGC 4872 has been indicated to contain an active galactic nucleus. NGC 4872 was discovered by astronomer Heinrich d'Arrest. It is a member of the Coma Cluster.

See also 
 List of NGC objects (4001–5000)
 NGC 4873
 NGC 4889

References

External links
 

Barred lenticular galaxies
Active galaxies
Coma Berenices
4872
44624
+05-31-068
Discoveries by Heinrich Louis d'Arrest
Coma Cluster